The Juice Media (TJM) is an Australian company that produces contemporary, human rights political and social satire.
They are known for their Internet series Honest Government Ads and Juice Rap News.

TJM has been at the centre of a number of social and political controversies, including the use of the "Australien" logo that is at the heart of a Bill to change the Australian Criminal Code Act 1995,  as well as their "Australia Day" parody video.

History 
TJM was founded by Giordano Nanni, an Australian historian, author, satirist and video producer. TJM started publishing on YouTube in May 2008 with the first episode of Juice Rap News premiering on 4 October 2009.

On 28 May 2016, the Juice Media launched the Honest Government ad series with Visit Australia.

Australia Day (Piracy parody) 
On 24 January 2017 TJM released a parody video called "Australia Day (Piracy parody)", which compared celebrating Australia Day on 26 January, when the First Fleet planted a flag on Australian shores, to celebrating several appalling historic events. The video was a parody of an anti-piracy ad, "You Wouldn't Steal a Car". The events depicted include the "Final Solution" by Nazi Germany, dropping of the atomic bomb on Hiroshima and 11th of September attacks on the Twin Towers.

The video was released as part of the Change the Date campaign (represented by the hashtag #changethedate) which calls for changing the date of Australia Day by Aboriginal, Torres Strait Islander and wider community groups, because celebrating the date that marked the beginning of an invasion of others' land, which included many killings of Aboriginal Australians, is insensitive.

This video incited a great deal of debate, especially on social media, with a lot of negative sentiments expressed especially at the comparison of 26 January to other historical dates. The National Australia Day Council responded by saying: "Though 26 January marks this specific event, today Australia Day celebrations reflect contemporary Australia: our diverse society and landscape, our remarkable achievements and our bright future. It also is an opportunity to reflect on our nation's history, and to consider how we can make Australia an even better place in future".

Honest Government Ads 

The Honest Government Ads are filmed in Melbourne. They are written by Giordano Nanni who creates the series in collaboration with Lucy Cahill. Actors appearing in the series are credited as Ellen Burbidge, Zoë Amanda Wilson and Matylda Buczko-Koren with Lucy Cahill also being credited with the voice overs.

These videos are a satirical take on Australian Government advertising. Each video targets a current social or political issue and highlights potential consequences of the Government's position and policy on that issue."And an increasingly popular way of sharing the ‘honest truth' about political events is through satirical videos, something that The Juice Media does brilliantly. They bring attention to the ridiculousness of political and worldwide events, not only by making people laugh but by being blunt about what is going on and how people are being taken advantage of. Not everyone agrees with their left wing politics, but it gets people talking."

Australien Coat of Harms 

The Australien Coat of Harms was created as the backdrop to the fictitious Department of Genuine Satire for the Honest Government Adverts. There are a number of notable differences between the fictitious Coat of Harms and the Commonwealth Coat of Arms that it lampoons, including:

 A stylised alien head replacing the Commonwealth star
 The heads of the emu and kangaroo have been replaced with surveillance cameras
 The bar under the star has been replaced with a buffering bar
 The 6 state emblems on the shield have been replaced with a pirate ship
 The "Australia" wording under the shield has been replaced with "Not the Real Logo"

In September 2017, TJM received an e-mail from the Australian National Symbols Officer requesting that the use of the satirical logo no longer be used as they had received complaints from the members of the public about the logo. Five days later a Bill was proposed to Australian parliament to amend the Criminal Code Act 1995. The summary for the Bill was stated as:Amends the Criminal Code Act 1995 to: introduce new offences for a person recklessly or intentionally representing themselves to be, or to be acting on behalf of, or with the authority of, a Commonwealth entity or service; and introduce a new injunction power to allow authorised persons to seek injunctive relief to prevent a person from engaging in conduct in contravention of the new offences.

The case for the amendments to the Bill was presented in the Senate by the Attorney-General of Australia, George Brandis. There were a number of public submissions to the Senate Legal and Constitutional Affairs Committee overseeing the proposed amendments. Among the submissions were pieces from Australian Lawyers for Human Rights and Electronic Frontiers Australia, both of which expressed concerns about the Bill regarding freedom of speech, the lack of safeguards, and ambiguous wording in the Bill which could result in legal action being taken against critics and satirists.It is unfortunate that the Australian government cannot distinguish between impersonation and satire. But it is especially worrying because the government has proposed legislation that would impose jail terms for impersonation of a government agency. Some laws against impersonating government officials can be appropriate (Australia, like the U.S., is seeing telephone scams from fraudsters claiming to be tax officials). But the proposed legislation in Australia lacks sufficient safeguards. Moreover, the recent letter to Juice Media shows that the government may lack the judgment needed to apply the law fairly.
This was a sentiment echoed by Greens MP Adam Bandt in a speech to parliament in which he addressed the topics of freedom of speech and the rights to "mercilessly troll government".

Senator Nick McKim is on record as saying:"Where does this leave satire in Australia? Does it mean that figures such as Shaun Micallef, The Juice Media and The Chaser team, as well as upcoming comedians, will have to think twice before they crack jokes lest they find themselves on the stand or in the slammer? As the government's then Attorney-General put it, 'The test of what genuine satire is will be, as I said, up to the courts.' Australian common law has never previously had to deal with defining genuine satire, meaning that satirists will be in the dark as to the potential limits of their jokes until a body of common law has been established."

Those found to be in breach of the new amendment could face 2–5 years' imprisonment. On 21 June 2018, the Criminal Code Amendment (Impersonating a Commonwealth Body) Bill 2017 was passed by both Houses and moved into law.

Juice Rap News 

An Internet-based Australian satirical news show consisting of a rapped "news report" with social commentary using comical rap lyrics.

See also 

 Honest Ads Act
 News satire
 Parody advertisement
 Political satire

References

External links 

 YouTube channel

Crowdfunding
Melbourne
Australian political satire
Australian parodists
Australian satirists
Viral videos
Companies based in Melbourne
Australian YouTubers
Human rights abuses in Australia